Dettingen is a suburban district of Rottenburg am Neckar in the administrative district of Tübingen in Baden-Württemberg (Germany).

Geography 

Dettingen is located 6 km (3.73 mi) southern from Rottenburg am Neckar, on the Gäu-Plateau with an elevation from 386 to 558 m.

Extent 

The area of the district is 962 hectares.

Population 

Dettingen has a population of 1783 people (31/01/08). It is the fourth largest district of Rottenburg. At an area of 9.62 km² (3.7 sq mi) this corresponds to a population density of 185 people per km², or 480 per sq mi.

Faiths 

The population of the village is predominantly Roman Catholic.

References

External links 
 Official Webpage (German)

Rottenburg am Neckar